The Sclerogryllinae are a subfamily of crickets, in the family Gryllidae (subfamily group Gryllinae), based on the type genus Sclerogryllus.  They may be known as "stiff-winged crickets" are terrestrial insects, distributed in: tropical Asia, Korea, Japan and West Africa.

Genera
The Orthoptera Species File lists just two genera:
 Sclerogryllus Gorochov, 1985 – type genus (in tribe Sclerogryllini Gorochov, 1985)
 Rhabdotogryllus Chopard, 1954 – monotypic – R. caraboides Chopard, 1954

References

External links
 

Orthoptera subfamilies
Ensifera
crickets
Orthoptera of Asia